In Greek mythology, Aethalides (Ancient Greek: Αἰθαλίδης) was a son of Hermes and Eupolemeia, a daughter of King Myrmidon of Phthia.

Mythology 
Aethalides was the herald of the Argonauts, and had received from his father the faculty of remembering everything, even in Hades. He was further allowed to reside alternately in the upper and in the lower world. As his soul could not forget anything even after death, it remembered that from the body of Aethalides it had successively migrated into those of Euphorbus, Hermotimus, Pyrrhus, and at last into that of Pythagoras, in whom it still retained the recollection of its former migrations.

Notes

References 
 Apollonius Rhodius, Argonautica translated by Robert Cooper Seaton (1853-1915), R. C. Loeb Classical Library Volume 001. London, William Heinemann Ltd, 1912. Online version at the Topos Text Project.
 Apollonius Rhodius, Argonautica. George W. Mooney. London. Longmans, Green. 1912. Greek text available at the Perseus Digital Library.
 Gaius Valerius Flaccus, Argonautica translated by Mozley, J H. Loeb Classical Library Volume 286. Cambridge, MA, Harvard University Press; London, William Heinemann Ltd. 1928. Online version at theio.com.
 Gaius Valerius Flaccus, Argonauticon. Otto Kramer. Leipzig. Teubner. 1913. Latin text available at the Perseus Digital Library.
 Hyginus, Fabulae from The Myths of Hyginus translated and edited by Mary Grant. University of Kansas Publications in Humanistic Studies. Online version at the Topos Text Project.
 The Orphic Argonautica, translated by Jason Colavito. © Copyright 2011. Online version at the Topos Text Project.

Argonauts
Myrmidons
Children of Hermes
Demigods in classical mythology
Characters in the Argonautica
Thessalian characters in Greek mythology